The 2012–13 Scottish Football League Third Division (known as the Irn Bru Scottish Football League Third Division for sponsorship reasons) was the 18th season in the current format of 10 teams in the fourth tier of Scottish football. Alloa Athletic were the current champions.

Rangers were confirmed as champions after a goalless away draw with Montrose on 30 March.
They were presented with the trophy after a 1–0 win against Berwick Rangers on 4 May in front of 50,048.

During their first season in the division, Rangers had one of the highest home attendances in Britain, consistently ranking in the top four in the UK as a whole and first in Scotland. They set the record for the highest attendance in a 4th tier league worldwide. Bottom side Stirling Albion defeated Rangers on 6 October 2012 in what was reported to be a shock result.

Teams

2011–12 champions Alloa Athletic were promoted from this division, and were replaced by Stirling Albion, who finished bottom of the Second Division. Another promotion spot was available through the promotion play-offs, however this was won by second division side Albion Rovers, who thus stayed in the Second Division. However, losing play-off finalists Stranraer were elevated to the Second Division as a result of Rangers being elected to the bottom tier.

There was no relegation from this division, as this is the lowest in the Scottish League.

Stadiums and locations

League table

Results
Teams play each other four times in this league. In the first half of the season each team plays every other team twice (home and away) and then do the same in the second half of the season, for a total of 36 games

First half of season

Second half of season

Season statistics

Top goalscorers

References

External links
Full Results and Fixtures

Scottish Third Division seasons
3
4
Scot